Inchoun (Chukchi: , I’nčuvin; Yupik: Инсиг’вик) is a rural locality (a selo) in Chukotsky District of Chukotka Autonomous Okrug, Russia. Population:  Municipally Inchoun is subordinated to Chukotsky Municipal District and is incorporated as Inchoun Rural Settlement.

History

Pre-history
The name of the village comes from the Chukchi word I'nchuvin, meaning "a cut-off nose tip". This strange appellation is derived from a nearby cliff with a large rock at its base that is said to look like a nose cut from a face. There is a Chukchi dancing troupe in the village called Vyrykvyn.

Excavations carried out by the Museum of Chukotka Heritage Centre and the State Museum of Northern Art at the Palpeygak site (named after a nearby eponymous creek) revealed finds indicating that the area had been inhabited for the last 3000 years

Twentieth Century
In 1945 Inchoun had the best Soviet reading rooms in the Okrug. In the 1950s, construction began on wooden houses in the village and by 1957, the first nine families moved out of their Yaranga and into these new houses.

Demographics
The population of the village as of 2009 was 398 an increase on the estimate in 2008 of 365, which itself was down from the figure given in March 2003 of 373 (of which 353 were indigenous peoples). The official census results indicate a slight reduction on the 2009 estimate to 387, of whom 185 were male and 202 female.

Transport
Inchoun is 150 miles from the district centre Lavrentiya and is not connected to any other part of the world by permanent road. However, there is a small network of roads within the settlement including:

 Улица Ачиргина (Ulitsa Achyrgyna) 
 Улица Коммунистическая (Ulitsa Kommunisticheskaya, lit. Communist Street) 
 Улица Морзверобоев (Ulitsa Morzveroboyev, li. Walrus-hunting Brigade Street)
 Улица Тенетегина (Ulitsa Tenetegina)
 Улица Центральная (Ulitsa Tsentralnaya, lit. Central Street)
 Улица Шипина (Ulitsa Shipina)
 Улица Школьная (Ulitsa Shkolnaya, lit. School Street)

Climate

Photo gallery

See also
List of inhabited localities in Chukotsky District

References

Notes

Sources

 
 
Strogoff, M, Brochet, P-C and Auzias, D. Petit Futé: Chukotka, "Avant-Garde" Publishing House, 2006.

Rural localities in Chukotka Autonomous Okrug
Chukchi Sea